Fredericton Fire Department is the Fire Department for the City of Fredericton, New Brunswick, first organized March 22, 1817.

Structure

 Administration: 1 Fire Chief, 1 Deputy Fire Chief, 3 Assistant Deputies + 3 Civilian Administrators
 Operations Division: 1 ADC of Operations, 96 Fire Suppression Personnel and a complement of Holiday Relief Fire Fighters employed in Over Time and cost reduction efforts.
 Fire Prevention Division: 1 ADC of Fire Prevention Improvement, Innovation and Training, 1 Captain of Fire Prevention and 3 FPOs 
 Training Division: 1 Training Officer and 1 Assistant Deputy Chief of Fire Prevention Improvement, Innovation and Training

Stations 
Station 1: York Street (city centre)
Station 2: Two Nations Crossing (north) 
Station 3: Kimble Drive (southeast) 
Station 4: Royal Road (northwest)
Station 5: Harrison Court (Marysville) CLOSED ca. 2010 Demolished along with former station 2 on MacLaren Ave.

Hazardous Materials Response Team 
The department operates the First of two Heavy Type I Regional HazMat/CBRNE Teams with funding support from the Province of New Brunswick.

Memorial 
The Fredericton Firefighter Memorial can be found on the riverfront at the bottom of Smythe Street and recognizes members who have died in the line of duty.

William A. Anderson Feb 16, 1865
Andrew Lipsett, Mar 5, 1905
George Clynick, Mar 29, 1929 
Vincent Porter, Oct 3, 1974
Gerald Trecartin, May 28, 1975
Benjamin Kerton, Jan 27, 1976
Robert Berryman, Mar 23, 2016
Roger J. Carnahan, Dec 20, 2019

External links
http://www.fredericton.ca/en/publicsafety/firedepartment.asp

1817 establishments in the British Empire
Fire departments in New Brunswick